Columbus Neighborhoods is a documentary television series produced by WOSU Public Media, a part of PBS. The series premiered in 2010 as a set of one-hour shows about historic neighborhoods in Columbus, Ohio.

Attributes
In addition to television episodes, the Columbus Neighborhoods project involves a website, educational materials for classrooms, community storytelling events, and town-hall forums. The initiative was the largest local project undertaken by the station at its inception.

The show is hosted by Charlene Brown and Javier Sanchez.

History
The series was initially to air in fall 2008. The first program in the series was on the Short North and areas around it: Victorian Village, Italian Village, Harrison West and Flytown. In December 2009, it was reported that the series was now set to air in celebration of the city's bicentennial in 2012. Preparations for the show involved numerous neighborhood meetings, videotaped interviews, and invitations for local residents to submit stories, old videos, and photographs. In March 2010, the first episode finally aired, as the first of initially only six episodes.

In 2013, at the end of Columbus's bicentennial year, a copy of the first season of Columbus Neighborhoods was placed along with other items into a time capsule. The capsule was placed at 77 North Front Street, and will be opened around the time of the tricentennial, in 2112.

Episodes
Episodes include:

Season 1
56- to 58-minute episodes:
The Short North
German Village
King-Lincoln
Downtown-Franklinton
University District
Olde Towne East

Season 2
54- to 57-minute episodes:
South Side
Clintonville
Worthington
Bexley
Tri-Village (Grandview Heights, Marble Cliff, and Upper Arlington)
New Americans

Season 3
26-minute episodes:

The Evolution of Preservation
Civil War Stories
Gathering Places
Ghost Stories and Halloween Traditions
Columbus' Influence on Aviation History
Central Ohio Veterans
Central Ohio's Ancient History
Central Ohio Food and Industry
Downtown Columbus
The Creative Community of Central Ohio
Columbus Music
Small Businesses and Humble Beginnings
Family and Community History
Education in Columbus
Columbus Public Institutions
Columbus Migrations
Unique Neighborhoods
Early Entertainment in Columbus
Activism in Columbus
Evolving Neighborhoods
Columbus by Rail
Heading East
Local Hangouts
New Americans
Dublin
Active History

Season 4
26-minute episodes:

Columbus and the Vietnam War Part 1
Columbus and the Vietnam War Part 2
Entertainment in Columbus
Halloween in Columbus
Chasing the Dream: Getting Ahead in Columbus
Columbus and World War I
Columbus' Railroad History
Columbus Food and Industry
Central Ohio Activism
Get the Picture: Columbus in Photographs
Creative Spaces
Retail Columbus
Living History
Renovating Columbus
Columbus on the Move
Gathering Places in Central Ohio
Architecture in Central Ohio
Spirituality in Columbus
Breaking Barriers
Lancaster, Ohio
Innovators
Education in Central Ohio
Uncovering the History of Milo-Grogan
Aging in Columbus
Getting Down to Business: Columbus Entrepreneurs
Westerville

Season 5
26-minute episodes:

Columbus Writ Large
Columbus Sports
Fall in Central Ohio
Central Ohio Cemeteries
Linden
Military
Getting Outdoors
Food and Industry in Columbus
Columbus Activism
Central Ohio Retail
Columbus Gathering Places
Preserving Columbus History
Entertaining Columbus
Grove City
Columbus Architecture
Education
Mount Vernon
Record Keeping
Preservation
Villains of Columbus
Ancient Connections
Small Neighborhoods
Intergenerational Living
Notable Women of Columbus
Columbus Railroads
Helping Hands

Season 6
26-minute episodes:

Preserving History
The Rural Side of Life
Lost History
Cemeteries
Halloween
Military Camps
Food & Industry
100th Episode!
Going Big
Somewhere There's Music
Preservation Activists
Where Are They Now?
Architects
In the Air
We Made That!
Southbound!
Celebrating Women
Up North
Preservation DIY
On the Canal!
Capturing History
Marching Across Ohio
A Celebration of New American Food
Underground Railroad
The Circus Comes To Town
The Ohio State University Sesquicentennial

Season 7
26-minute episodes:

West Side
Family
Remembering Our Ancestors
Spooky Ohio
Connections To The Land
Rush Creek Village
Getting Around With Darbee
The Collectors
Americana In Ohio
Historic Ohio Food Establishments
Education Reimagined
The Connectors
Tribute To A Prolific Ohio Historian
Columbus Pastimes
Ohio History Connection
Looking To Columbus' Past
Before They Were Parking Lots

References

External links
 
 Episodes on PBS and YouTube

Mass media in Columbus, Ohio
2010 American television series debuts
2010s American documentary television series
English-language television shows
Documentary television series about historical events in the United States